

Champions

Major League Baseball
World Series: Los Angeles Dodgers over Oakland Athletics (4–1); Orel Hershiser, MVP

American League Championship Series MVP: Dennis Eckersley
National League Championship Series MVP: Orel Hershiser
All-Star Game, July 12 at Riverfront Stadium: American League, 2–1; Terry Steinbach, MVP

Other champions
Baseball World Cup: Cuba
Caribbean World Series: Leones del Escogido (Dominican Republic)
College World Series: Stanford
Japan Series: Seibu Lions over Chunichi Dragons (4–1)
Korean Series: Haitai Tigers over Binggrae Eagles
Big League World Series: Taipei, Taiwan
Junior League World Series: Mexicali, Mexico
Little League World Series: Tai Ping, Taichung, Taiwan
Senior League World Series: Pingtung, Taiwan
Summer Olympic Games at Seoul, South Korea (demonstration sport): United States (1st), Japan (2nd), Puerto Rico (3rd)

Awards and honors
Baseball Hall of Fame
Willie Stargell
Most Valuable Player
Jose Canseco, Oakland Athletics, OF (AL)
Kirk Gibson, Los Angeles Dodgers, OF (NL)
Cy Young Award
Frank Viola, Minnesota Twins (AL)
Orel Hershiser, Los Angeles Dodgers (NL)
Rookie of the Year
Walt Weiss, Oakland Athletics, SS (AL)
Chris Sabo, Cincinnati Reds, 3B (NL)
Manager of the Year Award
Tony La Russa, Oakland Athletics (AL)
Tommy Lasorda, Los Angeles Dodgers (NL)
Woman Executive of the Year (major or minor league): Mindy Rich, Buffalo Bisons, American Association
Gold Glove Award
Don Mattingly (1B) (AL) 
Harold Reynolds (2B) (AL) 
Gary Gaetti (3B) (AL) 
Tony Fernández (SS) (AL) 
Kirby Puckett (OF) (AL) 
Gary Pettis (OF) (AL) 
Devon White (OF) (AL)
Bob Boone (C) (AL) 
Mark Langston (P) (AL)

MLB statistical leaders

Major League Baseball final standings

Events

January
January 4 – Bob Horner returns to the majors after spending one season in Japan, signing with the St. Louis Cardinals.
 The Minnesota Twins sign catcher Brian Harper as a free agent.
January 5 – Don Sutton returns home, signing a one-year contract with the Los Angeles Dodgers, the team he starred for in the 1970s.   
January 12 – Former Pittsburgh Pirates slugger Willie Stargell is the only player elected to the Hall of Fame by the Baseball Writers' Association of America. Stargell becomes the 17th player to be elected in his first year of eligibility. Pitcher Jim Bunning garners 317 votes (74.2%), and falls four votes shy of the 321 needed for election in his 13th year on the ballot.
January 15 – John Candelaria signs as a free agent with the New York Yankees.
January 22 – As a result of the Players Association's 1985 collusion suit against the owners, arbitrator Thomas Roberts declares seven players no-risk free agents until March 1, giving them a chance to sign with other clubs despite already having contracts. The seven are Juan Beníquez, Tom Brookens, Kirk Gibson, Carlton Fisk, Donnie Moore, Joe Niekro and Butch Wynegar.
January 25 – The Kansas City Royals sign catcher Jamie Quirk as  a free agent.
January 29 – Four days after being declared a free agent, Kirk Gibson signs with the Los Angeles Dodgers.

February
February 9 – The Oakland A's sign Don Baylor as a free agent.
February 15 – The Cincinnati Reds trade pitcher Jeff Montgomery to the Kansas City Royals for Van Snider. 
February 25 – Jose Cruz, who'd spent the 14 seasons as a member of the Houston Astros, signs a contract with the New York Yankees.

March
March 1 – For the first time since 1956, the Special Veterans Committee does not elect anyone to the Hall of Fame. Phil Rizzuto, Leo Durocher, Joe Gordon and Gil Hodges are among the candidates passed over.
March 24 – The Montreal Expos purchase the contract of Graig Nettles from the Atlanta Braves.
March 29 – The Chicago White Sox sign Jerry Reuss.

April
April 12 – The Baltimore Orioles dismiss manager Cal Ripken after their sixth consecutive loss starting the season. Ripken is replaced by Frank Robinson who will see the streak extended to a Major League-record 21 consecutive losses.
April 14 – Pilot Field opens in Buffalo as home to the AAA class Buffalo Bisons. The first retro-classic ballpark in the world, the stadium was built to try and attract a major league franchise.
April 29 – The Baltimore Orioles shut out the Chicago White Sox, 9–0, at Comiskey Park. It was the first victory of the season for the Orioles, behind a strong pitching effort by starter Mark Williamson, who was credited with the win after allowing three hits on two strikeouts and no walks in six innings of work. Closer Dave Schmidt earned the save, giving up one hit on one strikeout and no walks in three innings. For the Orioles, Cal Ripken Jr. went 4-for-5 with three runs and one RBI, including a double and a home run, while Eddie Murray hit a two-run homer. Jack McDowell was the losing pitcher. Baltimore is now 1–21.
April 30 – Cincinnati Reds manager Pete Rose shoves umpire Dave Pallone twice after a delayed call by Pallone at first base results in the New York Mets scoring the go-ahead run and the argument between Rose and Pallone escalates to the shovings when Pallone allegedly touched Rose under his eye pointing back at him.  Three days later, National League president A. Bartlett Giamatti suspends Rose for 30 days, the longest such suspension for an on-field incident by a manager in MLB history.

May
May 2 – Cincinnati Reds pitcher Ron Robinson, one out away from a perfect game, surrenders a single, and a home run before Cincinnati finally beat the Montreal Expos, 3–2.
 The Baltimore Orioles release former all-star pitcher Scott McGregor, ending his comeback bid.
May 9 – Bill Buckner is given his  outright release by the California Angels.
June 12 – Against the Atlanta Braves at the Astrodome, Mike Scott of the Houston Astros has a bid for his second career no-hitter broken up with two out in the ninth on a Ken Oberkfell single. The hit is the only one Scott allows in a 5–0 Astros victory. Scott had no-hit the San Francisco Giants on September 25, .

June
June 18 – The Los Angeles Dodgers sign Pedro Martinez as an undrafted free agent.
June 21 – With his team trailing 6–3 in the bottom of the ninth at Tiger Stadium against the New York Yankees, Alan Trammell hits an "ultimate walk-off grand slam" (with two outs and his team down by three runs) off reliever Cecilio Guante.  Trammell becomes the first, however, in major league history to do so with a 3–2 (three ball, two strike) count on him.
June 23 – Billy Martin is fired from his fifth stint as New York Yankees manager by owner George Steinbrenner after a four-game losing streak and a 2–7 road trip.  Lou Piniella is hired for the second time by the Yankees as his replacement.
June 26 – Craig Biggio makes his MLB debut. In three plate appearances, Biggio strikes out once, draws a walk and scores a run in Houston's 6–0 win over the San Francisco Giants.
June 30 – The Illinois General Assembly votes to help fund a new baseball stadium to replace Comiskey Park which is now the oldest stadium in Major League Baseball. The vote avoids the Chicago White Sox from having to carry through on a threat to move the team.

July
July 12 – After being maligned by the press as an unworthy All-Star starter, catcher Terry Steinbach hits a solo home run and a sacrifice fly to lead the American League to a 2–1 victory over the National League at Riverfront Stadium. Steinbach is named the Game MVP.
July 27 – The Texas Rangers sign catcher Ivan Rodriguez as an undrafted free agent.
July 29 – The Boston Red Sox trade away future World Series hero Curt Schilling, along with Brady Anderson to the Baltimore Orioles for Mike Boddicker.

August
August 9 – The Chicago Cubs won the first official night game at Wrigley Field by beating the New York Mets 6–4. The lights had been turned on just before the start of the prior night's game, but that game was rained out.
August 11
Having been stuck at 299 career home runs since May 16, New York Mets catcher Gary Carter clubs career home run #300 in a 9–6 victory over the Chicago Cubs at Wrigley Field.
The Boston Red Sox set an AL record with their 23rd straight win at home, beating the Detroit Tigers 9–4. Boston surpassed the league mark of 22 set by the 1931 Philadelphia Athletics.
August 26 – Donnie Moore is released by the California Angels, setting off a chain reaction of events that would end in July 1989 when Moore shot his wife and then turned the gun in himself, dying in an attempted murder/suicide. 
August 31 – Outfielder Fred Lynn is traded by the Baltimore Orioles to the Detroit Tigers in exchange for catcher Chris Hoiles and two minor leaguers.

September
September 3 – Gary Sheffield makes his MLB debut as a late inning defensive replacement for Dale Sveum, and does not make a plate appearance in Milwaukee's 7–3 win over the Detroit Tigers. Sheffield would get his first start the next day and go 0–4 in his first four plate appearances.   
September 8 – A. Bartlett Giamatti is unanimously elected by the owners to replace outgoing Commissioner Peter Ueberroth.
September 9 – Bruce Sutter converts his 300th career save (the third player in history to do so) to preserve an Atlanta Braves win over the San Diego Padres. It is the last save of his career.
September 16 – Tom Browning of the Cincinnati Reds pitches a 1-0 perfect game over the Los Angeles Dodgers. It is not only the tenth perfect game in Major League history, but the first to ever be pitched against the team that would go on to win the World Series that year. In defeating the San Diego Padres on June 6 of this season, Browning had another no-hitter broken up in the ninth inning. This bid was foiled by Tony Gwynn's single with one out.
September 17 – Jeff Reardon becomes the first pitcher to save 40 games in one season in both leagues as the Minnesota Twins beat the Chicago White Sox, 3–1. Reardon, who saved 41 games for the Montreal Expos in 1985, pitches the ninth inning for his 40th save in 47 opportunities.
September 20 – Wade Boggs becomes the first player in Major League history, since 1901, to collect 200 or more hits in six consecutive years. He is also the second player (to Lou Gehrig) to collect 200 hits and 100 bases on balls in three straight seasons.
September 23 – Jose Canseco steals his 40th base of the year, and becomes the first member of the 40–40 club.
September 24 – The Oakland Athletics defeat the Milwaukee Brewers 5–2 at County Stadium for their 100th win of the season. A's starter Dave Stewart picks up his 20th win of the season and Dennis Eckersley gets his 44th save of the season.
September 28 – One of the great season closing games in history is played as Orel Hershiser of the Los Angeles Dodgers and Andy Hawkins of the San Diego Padres each pitch ten scoreless innings. The Padres eventually win, but the tenth inning proves to be Hershiser's 59th consecutive scoreless inning, breaking Don Drysdale's record streak of 58 consecutive innings.
September 30 – For the second consecutive start, Dave Stieb of the Toronto Blue Jays has a no-hitter broken up with two out in the ninth, and has to settle for a one-hit shutout. In the Blue Jays' 4–0 victory over the Baltimore Orioles at Exhibition Stadium, he has the bid broken up by a Jim Traber single. Six days earlier, in a 1–0 shutout over the Cleveland Indians at Cleveland Stadium, Stieb's bid for a no-hitter was broken up by a Julio Franco single with two out in the ninth. Had Stieb accomplished the double no-hit feat, he would have joined Johnny Vander Meer (1938) as the only pitchers to hurl no-hitters in consecutive starts.

October
October 7 – Dave Concepción one of the last remaining active members of the Reds' "Big Red Machine" dynasty teams of the 1970s, is released. Ron Oester would be the final remaining player from that era on the Reds roster after Ken Griffey is released the next season. 
October 15 – In Game One of the 1988 World Series at Dodger Stadium, the Los Angeles Dodgers trail the Oakland Athletics, 4–3, in the bottom of the ninth inning when the Dodgers' Kirk Gibson, badly injured in the NLCS against the New York Mets, hobbles to the plate to pinch-hit against Oakland's lethal closer, Dennis Eckersley. With two outs, a 3–2 count against him, and Mike Davis on second base, Gibson uses his upper body and wrists to launch a backdoor slider from Eckersley into the right-field stands for a 5–4 Los Angeles victory. Gibson's home run re-energized the underdog Dodgers and shattered the confidence of the A's, who lost the series in five games. It inspired the coining of the phrase "walk-off home run", and is widely regarded as one of the greatest moments in baseball history.
October 20 – Los Angeles Dodgers pitcher Orel Hershiser ends his dream season with a 5–2 four-hitter over the Oakland Athletics in Game Five of the World Series. The win gives the Dodgers their first World Championship since 1981, and makes them the only team to win more than one World Series in the 1980s. Hershiser is selected the Series MVP.
October 24 – The New York Yankees trade Jack Clark and Pat Clemments to the San Diego Padres for Jimmy Jones, Lance McCullers and Stan Jefferson.
October 25 - Tony La Russa of the Oakland Athletics was named American League Manager of the Year by the Baseball Writers Association of America.
October 26 - 6 days after leading the Los Angeles Dodgers to an improbable World Championship, Tommy Lasorda was named National League Manager of the year by the Baseball Writers Association of America.

November
November 8 – The Baseball Hall of Fame and Museum announced the inauguration of Women in Baseball, a permanent display to honor the entire All-American Girls Professional Baseball League rather than any individual figure, which began play in 1943 and lasted a dozen years and gave more than 500 women an opportunity that had never existed before.
November 9 – Minnesota Twins pitcher Frank Viola is selected with 27 of 28 first place votes as the American League Cy Young Award winner. The left-hander posted a 24–7 record with 193 strikeouts and a 2.64 ERA.  
November 10:
Los Angeles Dodgers pitcher Orel Hershiser, who posted a 23–8 record with 178 strikeouts and a 2.31 ERA, is a unanimous choice as National League Cy Young Award winner. Hershiser becomes the ninth pitcher in National League history to win the award unanimously, after receiving all twenty-four first place votes from the BBWAA.
Tommy John  is released by the New York Yankees.  
November 28 – Rich Gedman becomes the highest paid catcher in American League history when he signs a one-year contract with the Boston Red Sox for $1.2 million.

December
December 4 – The Baltimore Orioles trade Eddie Murray to the Los Angeles Dodgers for Juan Bell, Brian Holton and Ken Howell. 
December 8 – The Cleveland Indians trade Julio Franco to the Texas Rangers in exchange for Jerry Browne, Oddibe McDowell and Pete O'Brien. 
December 14 – CBS pays approximately US$1.8 billion for exclusive over-the-air television rights for over four years (beginning in 1990). CBS pays about $265 million each year for the World Series, League Championship Series, All-Star Game, and the Saturday Game of the Week. CBS replaced ABC (which had broadcast Monday and later Thursday night baseball games from 1976 to 1989) and NBC (which had broadcast Major League Baseball in some shape or form since 1947 and the Game of the Week exclusively since 1966) as the national broadcast network television home of Major League Baseball. It was one of the largest agreements (to date) between the sport of baseball and the business of broadcasting. The cost of the deal between CBS and Major League Baseball is about 25% more than in the previous television contract with ABC and NBC.

Movies
Bull Durham
Eight Men Out

Births

January
January 1 – Dallas Keuchel
January 2 – Aaron Barrett
January 2 – Eric Fornataro
January 6 – Cody Hall
January 7 – Jhoulys Chacín
January 8 – Jon Edwards
January 10 – Rafael Dolis
January 10 – Jason Gurka
January 12 – Hyun Soo Kim
January 12 – Justin Marks
January 18 – Luis Jiménez
January 19 – Shawn Tolleson
January 21 – Preston Claiborne
January 21 – Josh Ravin
January 22 – Josh Spence
January 24 – Ashur Tolliver
January 26 – Josh Prince
January 28 – A. J. Griffin
January 29 – Mike Bolsinger
January 29 – Hank Conger

February
February 1 – Brett Anderson
February 1 – Allan de San Miguel
February 2 – Brad Peacock
February 2 – Travis Snider
February 10 – Jake Brigham
February 10 – Jeanmar Gómez
February 11 – Shane Peterson 
February 12 – Josh Phegley 
February 13 – Ryan Goins
February 14 – Paul Clemens
February 16 – Jorge Rondón
February 19 – Kevin Chapman
February 20 – Spencer Patton
February 21 – Tyler Lyons
February 22 – Rocky Gale
February 24 – Chris Parmelee
February 25 – Nathan Adcock
February 25 – Conor Mullee
February 26 – Dustin Ackley
February 26 – Héctor Rondón
February 28 – Aroldis Chapman

March
March 1 – Trevor Cahill
March 1 – Yang Hyeon-jong
March 4 – José de Paula
March 4 – Ryan Strausborger
March 5 – Joe Benson
March 5 – Héctor Gómez
March 6 – Leonys Martín
March 7 – Tyler Ladendorf
March 8 – Thomas Pham
March 8 – Ken Roberts
March 10 – Cedric Hunter
March 11 – Pedro Báez
March 11 – Vince Belnome
March 13 – Jason Rogers
March 14 – Josh Stinson
March 15 – Steve Ames
March 19 – Clayton Kershaw
March 23 – Dellin Betances
March 26 – Marcus Hatley 
March 28 – Ryan Kalish

April
April 1 – Alex Hassan
April 3 – Hirokazu Sawamura
April 6 – Mitsuo Yoshikawa
April 7 – Charles Brewer
April 9 – Simón Castro 
April 9 – Tommy Medica
April 10 – Chris Dwyer
April 10 – Chris Heston
April 11 – Pete Kozma
April 11 – Kenta Maeda
April 11 – Chris McGuiness
April 11 – Ryan Schimpf
April 13 – Tsubasa Aizawa
April 15 – Chris Tillman
April 16 – Shogo Akiyama
April 20 – Brandon Belt
April 22 – Dee Strange-Gordon
April 27 – José Miguel Fernández
April 30 – Ryan O'Rourke
April 30 – Jesús Sucre

May
May 2 – Neftalí Feliz
May 3 – Ben Revere
May 4 – Christian Bergman
May 7 – Sam Dyson
May 7 – Osvaldo Martínez
May 9 – Buddy Boshers
May 10 – Ryan Jackson
May 20 – Kyle Jensen
May 20 – Carlos Rivero
May 20 – Tony Sanchez
May 23 – Vic Black
May 27 – Brad Boxberger
May 27 – Garrett Richards
May 28 – Justin Bour
May 28 – Ryan Court
May 28 – Craig Kimbrel
May 28 – Lester Oliveros

June
June 1 – Francisco Peguero
June 5 – Jake Petricka
June 8 – Terrance Gore
June 9 – Joe Kelly
June 9 – Zach Rosscup
June 11 – Brock Holt
June 19 – Jacob deGrom
June 19 – Devin Mesoraco
June 28 – Kevan Smith
June 29 – Brooks Raley
June 30 – Jeff Kobernus
June 30 – Blake Treinen

July
July 2 – Chris Marrero
July 5 – Andre Rienzo
July 10 – Ryan Wheeler
July 13 – DJ LeMahieu
July 18 – Brett Nicholas
July 20 – Ty Kelly
July 20 – Stephen Strasburg
July 22 – Kwang-hyun Kim
July 25 – José Martínez
July 27 – Yoervis Medina

August
August 1 – Roenis Elías
August 2 – Brett Jackson
August 3 – Pat McCoy
August 10 – Sammy Solis
August 11 – Andrew Lambo
August 12 – Jake Dunning
August 12 – Jhan Mariñez
August 12 – José Tábata
August 13 – Brandon Workman
August 14 – Alex Liddi
August 16 – Justin Grimm
August 16 – J. C. Ramírez
August 19 – Chris Smith
August 23 – Miles Mikolas
August 26 – Elvis Andrus
August 26 – Mario Hollands
August 27 – A. J. Achter
August 27 – Seth Frankoff
August 27 – Mike Olt
August 29 – Alex White
August 31 – Matt Adams
August 31 – Caleb Gindl

September
September 3 – Josh Osich 
September 4 – Adam Duvall
September 6 – Arnold León
September 8 – Chance Ruffin
September 8 – Alex Sanabia
September 9 – Will Middlebrooks
September 9 – Joey Terdoslavich
September 11 – Mike Moustakas
September 13 – Marcus Walden
September 13 – Andy Wilkins
September 17 – Casey Crosby
September 20 – Steve Lombardozzi Jr.
September 21 – Che-Hsuan Lin
September 23 – Jedd Gyorko
September 24 – James Jones
September 24 – Moisés Sierra
September 24 – Hunter Strickland
September 26 – Chris Archer
September 26 – Yūdai Ōno
September 28 – Gary Brown
September 28 – Cameron Rupp
September 29 – Tyler Thornburg
September 30 – Sugar Ray Marimón
September 30 – Brian Moran

October
October 3 – Mike Belfiore
October 3 – Phil Gosselin
October 4 – Lonnie Chisenhall
October 7 – Brandon Cunniff
October 8 – Manny Barreda
October 9 – Starling Marte
October 9 – Yuki Yanagita
October 10 – Fernando Martínez
October 11 – David Goforth
October 11 – Edison Barrios
October 12 – José Ortega
October 12 – Nick Tepesch
October 14 – Merrill Kelly
October 14 – Seth Maness
October 17 – Stefen Romero
October 20 – Michael Mariot
October 20 – Gus Schlosser
October 25 – Alberto Cabrera
October 27 – T. J. Rivera
October 28 – Corban Joseph
October 29 – Johnny Hellweg

November
November 1 – Masahiro Tanaka
November 1 – Alex Wimmers
November 2 – Seth Rosin
November 3 – Carlos Moncrief
November 6 – James Paxton 
November 7 – Dariel Álvarez
November 8 – Yasmani Grandal
November 9 – Curt Casali
November 9 – Zach Neal
November 10 – Rob Segedin
November 15 – Ben Rowen
November 16 – Brandon Cumpton 
November 17 – Shane Greene
November 20 – Cody Allen
November 21 – Ryan LaMarre
November 21 – Matt West
November 22 – Drew Pomeranz
November 22 – Austin Romine
November 24 – Jarrod Parker
November 25 – Jimmy Paredes
November 26 – Josh Smoker
November 26 – Matt Tracy
November 26 – Héctor Velázquez
November 28 – Kevin Quackenbush
November 29 – Brett Nicholas

December
December 1 – Daniel Straily
December 2 – Brett Eibner
December 6 – Adam Eaton
December 12 – Juan Díaz
December 12 – Mike Kickham
December 13 – Perci Garner
December 14 – Matt Grace
December 14 - Hayato Sakamoto
December 15 – Ryan Pressly
December 20 – Erik Goeddel
December 20 – Braulio Lara
December 21 – Danny Duffy
December 21 – Cody Stanley
December 21 – Asher Wojciechowski
December 23 – Audry Pérez
December 23 – Roberto Pérez
December 27 – Rick Porcello
December 27 – Addison Reed
December 30 – Bryce Brentz
December 30 – Danny Burawa
December 30 – Drew Rucinski
December 31 – Álex Colomé

Deaths

January
January 6 – Ralph Buxton, 76, Canadian pitcher who played briefly for the 1938 Philadelphia Athletics and the 1949 New York Yankees.
January 12 – John H. Johnson, 66, president of Minor League Baseball from 1979 until his death; previously, farm system director of the Yankees from 1958 to 1971, and assistant to Commissioner of Baseball Bowie Kuhn from 1971 to 1979.
January 15 – George Hennessey, 80, pitcher for the St. Louis Browns, Philadelphia Phillies and Chicago Cubs between 1937 and 1945.
January 16 – Dutch Kemner, 88, relief pitcher who appeared in nine games with the 1929 Cincinnati Reds.
January 23 – Johnny Gee, 72, who pitched for the Pittsburgh Pirates and the New York Giants in the 1940s and also played basketball with the NBA Syracuse Nationals during the 1946–1947 season.
January 24 – Ray Rohwer, 92, outfielder who hit .284 for the Pittsburgh Pirates from 1921 to 1922.
January 28 – Al Rubeling, 74, backup infielder for the Philadelphia Athletics and Pittsburgh Pirates from 1940 through 1944.

February
February 1 – Red Phillips, 79, relief pitcher who posted a 4–4 record in 29 games for the Detroit Tigers in the 1934 and 1936 seasons.
February 3 – Jocko Thompson, 71, left-hander who pitched in 41 games for the Philadelphia Phillies for all or parts of four seasons (1948–1951); a much-decorated American lieutenant who served in the European Theater during World War II.
February 16 – Bill Cox, 74, pitcher in 50 games for the St. Louis Cardinals, Chicago White Sox and St. Louis Browns from 1936 to 1940, who later served in Germany in the U.S. Army during World War II.
February 20 – Bob O'Farrell, 91, catcher for four National League teams over 21 seasons who won the 1926 MVP award with the St. Louis Cardinals; player-manager of Cardinals (1927) and Cincinnati Reds (Opening Day through July 6, 1934).
February 20 – Jim Woods, 71, nicknamed "Possum", well-traveled but highly regarded #2 play-by-play broadcaster between 1953 and 1981 who called games for the New York Yankees, New York Giants, Pittsburgh Pirates, St. Louis Cardinals, Oakland Athletics, Boston Red Sox and USA Network; noted for his chemistry and collaboration with Pittsburgh's Bob Prince (1958–1969) and Boston's Ned Martin (1974–1978).
February 23 – Pete Donohue, 87, pitcher who had three 20-win seasons for the Cincinnati Reds and beat the Philadelphia Phillies 20 consecutive times from 1922 to 1925.
February 26 – Tom Oliver, 85, fine defensive center fielder for the Boston Red Sox in the early 1930s; later a coach for the Philadelphia Athletics and Baltimore Orioles between 1951 and 1954.
February 28 – Harvey Kuenn, 57, eight-time All-Star shortstop and outfielder, most notably with the Detroit Tigers, who batted .303 lifetime and led the American League in hits four times and doubles three times, while winning the 1953 Rookie of the Year Award and the 1959 batting title; later, a longtime batting coach who managed the Milwaukee Brewers—nicknamed "Harvey's Wallbangers"—to their only AL pennant in 1982; compiled a 159–118 mark (.572) as skipper of the Brewers between June 2, 1982 and end of the 1983 season.

March
March 1 – Luis "Canena" Márquez, 62, the third Puerto Rican to play in the major leagues (after Hiram Bithorn and Luis Rodríguez Olmo), who appeared in 68 games from 1951 to 1954 with the Boston Braves, Chicago Cubs, and Pittsburgh Pirates.
March 6 – Lou Legett, 86, catcher for the Boston Red Sox between 1929 and 1935.
March 6 – Dick Ricketts, 54, pitcher for the 1959 St. Louis Cardinals and also a forward-center in NBA with the St. Louis Hawks and the Rochester/Cincinnati Royals from 1955 to 1958; his brother Dave was a longtime backup catcher and coach in MLB.
March 11 – Art Daney, Chief Whitehorn, 84, Native American of the Choctaw Nation of Oklahoma, who pitched briefly for the 1928 Philadelphia Athletics.
March 14 – Zeb Terry, 96, shortstop/second baseman who hit .260 in 589 games for the Boston Braves, Chicago Cubs, Chicago White Sox and Pittsburgh Pirates from 1916 to 1922.
March 16 – Jigger Statz, 90, outfielder for the New York Giants, Boston Red Sox, Chicago Cubs and Brooklyn Robins from 1919 to 1928, who hit .319 for the 1923 Cubs including 209 hits, 110 runs, 51 extrabases, 70 RBI and 29 stolen bases; played 18 seasons for Los Angeles Angels of the Pacific Coast League; amassed 4,093 hits over a 24-year career. 
March 21 – Edd Roush, 94, Hall of Fame center fielder for the Cincinnati Reds who batted .323 lifetime, leading the National League in batting twice and in slugging, doubles and triples once each, while hitting 30 inside-the-park home runs and ending with 182 triples for the 13th-most triples in major league history.
March 29 – Ted Kluszewski, 63, All-Star first baseman who played from 1947 through 1961 for four teams, most prominently the Cincinnati Reds/Redlegs; led the National League with 49 home runs and 141 RBI in 1954 and batted .300 seven times; batting star for Chicago White Sox in 1959 World Series and author of first homer in Los Angeles Angels' MLB history (1961); known for sporting a sleeveless uniform jersey that showcased his muscular biceps; served as Cincinnati's hitting coach during "The Big Red Machine" dynasty of the 1970s.

April
April 4 – Jack Aragón, 72, a 12-season catcher and manager in the minor leagues who appeared in one game for the 1941 New York Giants; son of Angel Aragón.
April 4 – Charlie Snell, 94, backup catcher who hit .211 in eight games for the 1912 St. Louis Browns.
April 5 – Tom Earley, 71, relief pitcher who posted an 18–24 record with a 3.78 ERA for the Boston Braves from 1938 to 1945.
April 9 – Syd Cohen, 81, pitcher for the Washington Senators from 1934 to 1937, and later a minor league baseball manager; elder brother Andy was an MLB player and coach who died six months and 20 days after Syd.
April 12 – Frank Skaff, 77, first baseman for the 1935 Brooklyn Dodgers and the 1943 Philadelphia Athletics; longtime scout, minor league skipper and MLB coach who served as acting manager of the 1966 Detroit Tigers.
April 14 – Ralph Winegarner, 78, infielder/outfielder/pitcher for the Cleveland Indians and St. Louis Browns in parts of six seasons spanning 1930–1949; coached for the Browns, 1949–1951.
April 15 – John Hines, 87, outfielder/catcher for the Chicago American Giants of the Negro National League between 1923 and 1934; member of its 1926 Negro World Series champions.
April 22 – Len Church, 46, relief pitcher for the 1966 Chicago Cubs.
April 27 – Alphonse "Tommy" Thomas, 88, pitcher who won 117 games for the Chicago White Sox, Washington Senators, Philadelphia Phillies, St. Louis Browns and Boston Red Sox from 1926 through 1937; managed minor-league Baltimore Orioles, 1940 to 1949, then served as a Red Sox scout.
April 29 – Dom Dallessandro, 74, outfielder for the Boston Red Sox and Chicago Cubs in eight seasons from 1937 to 1947; posted a .304 average and a .400 on-base percentage in 1944; missed 1945 Cubs' pennant-winning season and a chance to play in the World Series due to World War II military service.

May
May 2 – Art Hefner, 74, centerfielder and third baseman for the 1948 New York Black Yankees and 1949 Philadelphia Stars of the Negro National League.
May 12 – Jacquelyn Kelley, 61, All-Star outfielder in the All-American Girls Professional Baseball League.
May 12 – Hank Schenz, 69, backup infielder who posted a .247 average in 207 games for the Cubs, Pirates and Giants from 1946 through 1951.
May 25 – Charlie Perkins, 82, pitcher for the Philadelphia Phillies and Brooklyn Dodgers in the early 1930s.
May 26 – Dick Strahs, 64, relief pitcher for the 1954 Chicago White Sox.

June
June 1 – Belve Bean, 83, relief pitcher who posted an 11–7 record with the Indians and Senators from 1930 to 1935.
June 8 – Walt Chipple, 69, backup outfielder for the 1945 Washington Senators.
June 9 – Newt Allen, 87, five-time All-Star second baseman for the Negro leagues' Kansas City Monarchs; two-time (1924, 1942) Negro World Series champion, the latter year as the Monarchs' player-manager.
June 12 – Merle Settlemire, 85, relief pitcher for the 1928 Boston Red Sox.
June 15 – Hugh Willingham, 82, backup infielder for the Chicago White Sox and Philadelphia Phillies from 1930 to 1933; later became a longtime White Sox scout.
June 17 – Ed Montague, 82, shortstop for the Cleveland Indians between 1928 and 1932, who later became a scout, most notable for signing Willie Mays; father of the longtime umpire.
June 19 – Alice DeCambra, 66, infielder/pitcher during five seasons in the All-American Girls Professional Baseball League.
June 21 – Ed Linke, 76, relief pitcher who posted a 22–22 record with the Washington Senators and St. Louis Browns from 1933 to 1938.
June 22 – Hank Edwards, 69, outfielder who hit .280 with a .343 on-base percentage in 735 games with the Indians, Cubs, Dodgers, Reds, White Sox and Browns from 1941 to 1953.
June 27 – Red Bullock, 76, pitcher for the 1936 Philadelphia Athletics.

July
July 1 – Ed Sauer, 69, outfielder who played in the 1940s with the Chicago Cubs, St. Louis Cardinals and Boston Braves; brother of Hank Sauer.
July 2 – Tom Drake, 75, relief pitcher for the Cleveland Indians and Brooklyn Dodgers from 1939 to 1941.
July 4 – Lee Weyer, 51, National League umpire from 1963 until his death; worked in four World Series and five NL Championship Series.
July 8 – Frank Ellerbe, 84, third baseman who hit .268 in 420 games for the Senators, Browns and Indians from 1919 to 1924.
July 10 – Ernie Nevel, 69, relief pitcher who appeared in 14 games with the New York Yankees and Cincinnati Reds from 1950 to 1953.
July 14 – Whitey Witt, 92, outfielder who hit .287 with 18 home runs and 302 RBI in 1139 games for the Athletics, Yankees and Robins from 1916 to 1926; the last surviving member of the 1923 New York Yankees' World Series champions.
July 15 – Clyde Beck, 88, infielder for the Chicago Cubs and Cincinnati Reds from 1926 to 1931.
July 20 – John W. Galbreath, 90, real estate executive and majority owner of the Pittsburgh Pirates from 1950 to 1985, during which period the team won three World Series.
July 23 – Ken Polivka, 67, relief pitcher who appeared in two games with the 1947 Cincinnati Reds.
July 24 – Jerry Lane, 62, pitcher for the Senators and Reds from 1953 to 1955.
July 24 – Joe Orengo, 73, valuable man at all four infield positions, who hit .238 in 366 games for the Cardinals, Giants, Dodgers, Tigers and White Sox between 1939 and 1945.
July 26 – Al Flair, 62, first baseman for the 1941 Boston Red Sox.
July 27 – Jack Drees, 71, Chicago sportscaster and television voice of the White Sox from 1968 to 1972; also known for football, boxing and horse racing broadcast work.

August
August 2 – Bob Berman, 89, backup catcher for the 1918 Washington Senators.
August 5 – Ralph Michaels, 86, backup infielder who hit .295 in 32 games for the Cubs from 1924 to 1926.
August 13 – Mel Almada, 75, outfielder who hit .284 from 1933 through 1939 for the Boston Red Sox, Washington Senators, St. Louis Browns and Brooklyn Dodgers, who is regarded as the first Mexican player to appear in a major league baseball game.
August 13 – Edward Bennett Williams, 68, prominent Washington attorney and sportsman; co-owner or owner of that city's NFL franchise from 1962 to 1974; owner of the Baltimore Orioles from August 2, 1979, until his death.
August 22 – Bob Daughters, 74, played for the 1937 Boston Red Sox.
August 29 – Charles Johnston, 92, American League umpire in 1936 and 1937.
August 31 – John Daley, 101, shortstop for the 1912 St. Louis Browns, the oldest living major league player at the time of his death.

September
September 2 – Jim Bagby Jr., 71, All-Star pitcher for the Red Sox and Indians (1938–1947), who led AL in starts and innings in 1943.
September 2 – Marshall Riddle, 70, Negro league baseball infielder.
September 6 – Lew Krausse, 76, relief pitcher who posted a 5–1 record with a 4.50 ERA in 23 appearances for the Philadelphia Athletics from 1931 to 1932; longtime scout and minor-league manager; father of the MLB pitcher of the 1960s and 1970s.
September 8 – Arthur "Rats" Henderson, 92, stalwart pitcher for the Atlantic City Bacharach Giants of the Eastern Colored League from 1923 to 1928; led ECL in both games won and lost (ten) in 1923.
September 16 – Bob Trice, 62, pitcher who on September 13, 1953 became the first African American player in Philadelphia Athletics history; posted a 9–9 (5.75 ERA) record in 27 games for the A's through May 2, 1955.
September 29 – Tony Ordeñana, 69, shortstop for the 1943 Pittsburgh Pirates, and one of many players who only appeared in the majors during World War II.

October
October 6 – Bob Boken, 80, infielder for the Washington Senators and Chicago White Sox from 1933 to 1934.
October 8 – Boob Fowler, 87, infielder who hit .326 in 78 games for the Cincinnati Reds and Boston Red Sox from 1923 through 1926.
October 14 – Abie Hood, 85, second baseman who hit .286 in five games for the 1925 Boston Braves.
October 14 – Vic Raschi, 69, All-Star pitcher who won 20 games for the Yankees in three straight years (1949–1951), including World Series clinchers in 1949 and 1951; all told, played for six World Series champions (1947 and 1949–1953).
October 19 – Bill Burgo, 67, backup outfielder for the Philadelphia Athletics in the 1943 and 1944 seasons.
October 21 – Regino "Reggie" Otero, 73, Cuban first baseman who had a long minor league career (1936–1953); played briefly with the 1945 Chicago Cubs and 13 years in the Cuban League; later a successful career manager in the Cuban, Mexican and Venezuelan leagues; coached in the majors for the Cincinnati Reds (1959–1965) and Cleveland Indians (1966), then scouted for the Indians and Dodgers.
October 26 – Bill Johnson, 92, catcher in Black baseball who played primarily in the Eastern Colored League during the 1920s.
October 27 – Ben Steiner, 67, second baseman for the Boston Red Sox and Detroit Tigers from 1945 to 1947.
October 28 – Dave Tyriver, 50, pitcher for the 1962 Cleveland Indians.
October 29 – Andy Cohen, 84, second baseman who hit .281 in 262 games with the New York Giants from 1926 to 1929; acting manager of 1960 Philadelphia Phillies for one game (April 14) between terms of Eddie Sawyer and Gene Mauch; younger brother Syd, an MLB pitcher, died earlier in 1988 (on April 9).
October 30 – Bernie Walter, 80, pitcher for the 1930 Pittsburgh Pirates.

November
November 1 – Lefty Sullivan, 72, pitcher for the 1939 Cleveland Indians.
November 5 – Glenn Chapman, 82, infielder who hit .280 in 67 games for the 1934 Brooklyn Dodgers.
November 9 – Bob Weiland, 82, pitcher who won 62 games with the White Sox, Red Sox, Indians, Browns and Cardinals between 1928 and 1940.
November 16 – Johnny Hayes, 78, two-time All-Star catcher who appeared for four Negro National League clubs, mainly the New York Black Yankees, between 1934 and 1948.
November 19 – Kid Lowe, 88, third baseman for the Memphis Red Sox and three other Negro National League teams between 1921 and 1930.
November 21 – Carl Hubbell, 85, Hall of Fame pitcher who won 253 games for the New York Giants, second most among NL left-handers upon retirement; named NL's MVP in 1933 and 1936, he led league in wins and ERA three times each and had 1.79 ERA in six World Series starts; 1,677 strikeouts were NL record for left-handers until 1958, and won 24 straight games in 1936–37; served Giants as their longtime farm system director from 1943 until 1975.
November 22 – Ray Kelly, 74, sportswriter who covered the Philadelphia Athletics and Phillies since the late 1940s.
November 28 – Butch Davis, 72, outfielder who played in Black baseball, the Negro leagues (batting .341 for the 1947 Baltimore Elite Giants), independent leagues and, in 1951 and 1952, "organized" minor league baseball.
November 30 – Wally Berger, 83, All-Star center fielder for the Boston Braves who had four 100-RBI seasons and batted .300 lifetime; led NL in homers and RBI in 1935; his 38 homers as a 1930 rookie (tied by Frank Robinson in 1956) stood as an MLB record until 1987.

December
December 12 – Joe Reichler, 73, sportswriter and author who wrote for the Associated Press for 20 years and served as an assistant to the commissioner after 1966; editor of the Macmillan Baseball Encyclopedia since its first edition in 1969.
December 16 – Joe Hatten, 72, pitcher who posted a 65–49 record with a 3.87 ERA for the Brooklyn Dodgers and Chicago Cubs from 1946 through 1952.
December 16 – Bob Kahle, 73, pinch-hitter for the 1938 Boston Braves.
December 16 – Leonard Lindsay, 79, first baseman who appeared for three Negro leagues clubs over four seasons between 1935 and 1947.
December 21 – Willie Kamm, 88, third baseman for the White Sox and Indians who led AL in fielding average eight times and in putouts seven times; batted .308 in 1928 and led league in walks in 1925.
December 29 – John Happenny, 87, backup infielder who hit .221 in 32 games for the 1923 Chicago White Sox.
December 29 – Earl Mossor, 63, pitcher who appeared in three games with the 1951 Brooklyn Dodgers.
December 31 – Wes Flowers, 75, relief pitcher who posted a 2–2 record with a 5.40 ERA for the Brooklyn Dodgers in 1940 and 1944, and later served in the Navy during World War II.

References

External links

Major League Baseball official website 
Minor League Baseball official website
Baseball Almanac – Major League Baseball Players Who Died in 1988